Şefaatli is a town and district of Yozgat Province in the Central Anatolia region of Turkey. According to 2000 census, population of the district is 30,013 of which 13,728 live in the town of Şefaatli.

Notes

References

External links
 Şefaatli 
 District municipality's official website 
 General information,pictures on Şefaatli and pictures, live webcam and radio 
 General information on Şefaatli 

Populated places in Yozgat Province
Districts of Yozgat Province